Disney's Wilderness Lodge is a resort hotel located at the Walt Disney World Resort in Lake Buena Vista, Florida. Opened on May 28, 1994, the resort is owned and operated by Disney Parks, Experiences and Products. Disney's Wilderness Lodge is located in the Magic Kingdom Resort Area on Bay Lake. The resort is located near Disney's Fort Wilderness Resort & Campground. A similarly-themed resort, Disney's Grand Californian Hotel & Spa, is located at the Disneyland Resort in California.

Resort
Disney's Wilderness Lodge hotel was designed by Peter Dominick. It is modeled after the atmosphere of the national parks of the western United States and features both natural and Native American elements. The main building was modeled after the Old Faithful Inn in Yellowstone National Park. An artificial geyser and hot springs are located on the resort grounds. The Resort has eight floors of Lodgepole pine imported from Oregon, as well as 55-foot, authentic totem poles, and an 82-foot fireplace representing the colorful rocks of the Grand Canyon. This display represents Northwestern Native American artifacts, myths, legends, and stories. The Lodge is a 4-star deluxe Walt Disney World resort. Lodge guests have access to restaurants, a spa and fitness center, theme pools, jacuzzi hot tubs, a kids' zone and babysitting center, and fun and educational activities for adults and children.

Boat transportation is available to the Magic Kingdom, Disney's Contemporary Resort, and Disney's Fort Wilderness Resort & Campground.

In November 2007, the resort received designation as part of the Florida Green Lodging Program.

Amenities

Dining
Storybook Dining at Artist Point is a Snow White and the Seven Dwarfs character meet-and-greet offering classic American food.

Whispering Canyon Cafe is an Old West-themed eatery featuring all-you-can-eat skillets and wooden stick horses.

Geyser Point Bar & Grill is a waterfront bar and grill. 

Roaring Fork is a quick-service eatery serving popular breakfast, lunch, and dinner dishes.  

Territory Lounge is the resort's bar, offering craft brews and wine, as well as appetizers.

Recreation
Copper Creek Springs Pool is the resort's main and largest pool, featuring a 67-foot waterslide.

Boulder Ridge Cove Pool is the second and smallest pool at the resort.

Buttons and Bells Arcade is the resort's arcade, featuring various games.

The resort also hosts campfire activities, movies under the stars and guided fishing excursions as well as bike and motorized boat rentals.

Transportation
Disney's Wilderness Lodge is served by Disney Transport bus and watercraft transportation. Buses are available to all four theme parks, both waterparks, Disney Springs, and Disney's Fort Wilderness Resort & Campground. Watercraft service is available only to Magic Kingdom.

Boulder Ridge Villas
Originally known as The Villas at Disney's Wilderness Lodge, a Disney Vacation Club timeshare resort on the site, were announced in 1998, and the property first accepted guests in November 2000. The Boulder Ridge Villas at Disney's Wilderness Lodge are adjacent to Disney's Wilderness Lodge, whose design is based on the National Park lodges of America's western states. The Vacation Club Villas are themed to the antecedent lodgings built by workers on the transcontinental railroad in the late 19th century. The main building for the villas has railroad artwork and memorabilia on display, including two train cars from Walt Disney's ridable miniature Carolwood Pacific Railroad. The accommodations include Studio units with a kitchenette, as well as one and two-bedroom villas with a larger kitchen and living space. In late 2015, Disney began an extensive building project to expand the Villas with waterside units similar to those found over the water at Disney's Polynesian Village Resort, as well as recreation and dining facilities.

Copper Creek Villas & Cabins 
These cabins opened in Summer 2017 as the second DVC property at the resort, which consists of 26 Cascade Cabins.  The Cascade Cabins were built along the shoreline of the resort and the entire South wing of the original resort building, which was converted from regular hotel rooms to 158 DVC units.

Popular culture
In the ABC sitcom Family Matters two-part episode "We're Going to Disney World" Steve Urkel and the Winslows stay at the Wilderness Lodge. Some scenes were filmed on location outside the main doors and inside the lobby.

Gallery

References

External links

, Disney's Wilderness Lodge
, The Villas at Disney's Wilderness Lodge
Social Media

1994 establishments in Florida
Disney Vacation Club
Hotel buildings completed in 1994
Hotels established in 1994
Wilderness Lodge